Qarah Bonyad (also Romanized as Qarah Bonyād and Qareh Bonyād; also known as Qal‘eh-ye Bonyād) is a village in Nahr-e Mian Rural District, Zalian District, Shazand County, Markazi Province, Iran. At the 2006 census, its population was 761, in 177 families.

References 

Populated places in Shazand County